The Belfast and County Down (BCDR)   were a class of four coupled tank locomotives build by Beyer, Peacock & Company in 1920.  Generally reliable and well-liked but with mediocre performance they were to spend their lives on the  Belfast to  until withdrawal in the early 1950s. These were the only example of  wheel arrangement to work in Ireland apart from two examples on the narrow gauge.

History
At the end of World War I, the BCDR directors decided they would like some more powerful locomotives, and were impressed by the LB&SCR L class  "Brighton Baltics" on the London to Brighton line, and Petterson considered a requirement to procure a similar type imposed upon locomotive superintendent R. G. Miller. When the locomotives arrived in 1920 from Beyer, Peacock & Company they were inherited by Miller's successor Crossthwait. The BCDR locomotives had smaller dimensions: 19x26in cylinders as opposed to 21x28in; driving wheels 5 ft 9 in as opposed to 6 ft 9 in. At over 81 tons, the locomotives were noted for being very heavy.

In service, the class was reliable but performance was mediocre and coal consumption was very high. Boocock has described them as "handsome" and "well-liked" and suggests the problem may have been due to short-travel piston valves rather than drafting.

The BCDR was absorbed into the Ulster Transport Authority (UTA) on 3 September 1948, the class being renumbered 222 to 225.  Class WT  were transferred to the Bangor line from summer 1949 and their performance was substantially better, and they began to replace the BCDR engines, with UTA MED diesel railcars, the Bangor line losing all steam working by 1953.  Only one worked past 1952, No. 222 surviving on the former Northern Counties Committee network with the remainder lying withdrawn at  sidings.  All were disposed for scrap in 1956.

References

Notes

Footnotes

Sources
 
 
 
 

Beyer, Peacock locomotives
4-6-4T locomotives
Steam locomotives of Ireland
Steam locomotives of Northern Ireland
Scrapped locomotives
Railway locomotives introduced in 1920
5 ft 3 in gauge locomotives